Hamilton Standard was an American aircraft propeller parts supplier. It was formed in 1929 when United Aircraft and Transport Corporation consolidated Hamilton Aero Manufacturing and Standard Steel Propeller into the Hamilton Standard Propeller Corporation.  Other members of United Aircraft included Boeing, United Airlines, Sikorsky and Pratt & Whitney.  At the time, Hamilton was the largest manufacturer of aircraft propellers in the world.

History

Standard Steel Propeller had been formed in 1918 in Pittsburgh, Pennsylvania, and Hamilton Aero Manufacturing had been formed in 1920 in Milwaukee, Wisconsin, by Thomas F. Hamilton.  Charles Lindbergh's Spirit of St. Louis used a propeller made by Standard Steel Propeller Company in his historic solo crossing of the Atlantic Ocean. The two companies were merged in 1929 by the United Aircraft and Transport Corporation.

In the early 1930s, Frank W. Caldwell  of Hamilton Standard led a team that developed a variable-pitch propeller, using hydraulic pressure and centrifugal force to change the angle of attack of the blades. Caldwell received the 1933 Collier Trophy for this advance in flight propulsion. Later advances included full-feathering and reversible propellers.

Hamilton Standard was a division of United Aircraft Corporation (1934) along with Pratt & Whitney (engines).

In the early 1950s Hamilton developed the technology to accurately meter fuel in jet engines, and its fuel controls were employed on Boeing 707s and Douglas DC-8s, as well as most other Pratt & Whitney jet engines. In 1952, Hamilton Standard opened its plant in Windsor Locks, Connecticut. In 1958, Hamilton's first environmental control system entered service on the Convair 880.  In 1968, Hamilton began delivering automatic, electronic systems for control of cabin pressure in aircraft.  Hamilton's mechanical fuel controls, in use since the 1950s, evolved into electronically controlled fuel controls, and eventually, to full-authority digital electronic controls (FADEC) for jet engines, which are in use today on many commuter, airline, and military engine applications.  Hamilton's environmental systems and early association with NASA were highlighted in the 1969 Apollo 11 moon landing - supported by environmental control, fuel cell, and life support systems manufactured by Hamilton Standard.

General Motors' propeller business, which originated with its purchase of Aeroproducts in 1940, was acquired by Hamilton Standard in 1990.

Mergers

In 1999, the United Technologies Corporation acquired the Sundstrand Corporation and merged it with Hamilton to form Hamilton Sundstrand.  Sundstrand brought a long history and portfolio of aerospace products to the newly named company.  Hamilton Sundstrand continues to provide aerospace components and systems to most of the world's aircraft manufacturers, including Boeing, Airbus, Bombardier, and Embraer.

In 2012 Hamilton Sundstrand merged with Goodrich Corporation to become UTC Aerospace Systems. In 2018, UTC merged UTC Aerospace Systems with Rockwell Collins to form Collins Aerospace.

See also
List of aircraft propeller manufacturers
Atlantic Southeast Airlines Flight 529
Atlantic Southeast Airlines Flight 2311

References 

Aerospace companies of the United States
Aircraft propeller manufacturers
Companies based in Hartford County, Connecticut
Manufacturing companies established in 1929
American companies established in 1929
1929 establishments in the United States
Manufacturing companies disestablished in 1999
American companies disestablished in 1999
1999 disestablishments in Connecticut